Hembram is a surname found in India. Notable people with the surname include:

Arjun Charan Hembram, Indian writer in the Santali language and a banker
Kali Charan Hembram (born 1960), Indian writer in the Santali language
Kunar Hembram, Indian politician
Phoolchand Hembram (born 1989), Indian footballer
Purnima Hembram (born 1993), Indian sprinter and heptathlete
Sarojini Hembram (born 1959), Indian politician
Seth Hembram, Indian politician
Sweety Sima Hembram, Indian politician